The North East WOMENS Regional Football League is at the fifth and sixth levels of the English women's football pyramids.

Current clubs (2022–23)

Premier Division

Division One North

Division One South

External links
North East Women's Regional League at FA Full Time

5